Arytera divaricata, known as the gap axe, coogara, coogera or rose tamarind is a forest tree of eastern Australia. An attractive plant with glossy pale and limp new leaves. It grows in fairly dry situations, often in littoral rainforests and monsoon forest.

The southernmost limit of natural distribution Port Stephens (32° S) in New South Wales, extending north to Cape York at the northernmost tip of Australia. The generic name Arytera is from the Greek for cup. The fruit valves are of a cup shape. divaricata from the Latin which refers to the wide spreading branchlets of the flower panicle.

Description
A small to large tree with dark mature leaves. Achieving a height of over 35 metres tall, though usually seen less than ten metres tall. The base of the tree is somewhat flanged. Smooth greyish thin bark.

The leaves are pinnate and alternate, of two to six pairs of leaflets. Leaf shape lanceolate to ovate, not toothed. Leaflets 5 to 15 cm long, 1.5 to 6 cm wide. Hairy and leathery. Usually not with a sharp point. Shiny green above. Red, pink then yellow new foliage. Leaf stem 3 to 6 mm long. Midrib raised above and below. Leaves distinctly veined. 8 to 12 main lateral leaf veins.

Flowers form between November to April, being cream in colour, on wide and hairy panicles. The fruit is a capsule, with three lobes. Brown oval shaped seeds are enclosed in red fleshy aril. Seeds mature from June to October. Seed germination is reliable. Often as fast as seven days for roots to show.

Uses
A decorative and ornamental tree.

References

 
 

divaricata
Sapindales of Australia
Trees of Australia
Ornamental trees
Flora of Queensland
Flora of New South Wales
Taxa named by Ferdinand von Mueller